Rely Selson Cabral de Barros (born 6 May 1997) is a footballer who plays as a winger for Leioa. Born in Spain, he represents the Cape Verde national team.

Professional career
A youth product of Ponferradina, Cabral began his footballing career with Zamora, Barco, and Ourense. He transferred to Leioa in the Segunda División B on 5 August 2019.

International career
Born in Spain, Cabral is of Cape Verdean descent. He was called up to the Cape Verde national team for a pair of friendlies in June 2021. He debuted with the Cape Verde national team in a friendly 2–0 loss to Senegal on 8 June 2021.

References

External links
 
  
 

1997 births
Living people
Citizens of Cape Verde through descent
Cape Verdean footballers
Association football wingers
Cape Verde international footballers
People from El Bierzo
Sportspeople from the Province of León
Spanish footballers
Zamora CF footballers
CD Ourense footballers
Segunda División B players
Tercera División players
Spanish people of Cape Verdean descent
Spanish sportspeople of African descent